The South-Eastern European Digitization Initiative (SEEDI) is an effort to develop awareness about digitization of cultural and scientific heritage in the South-Eastern European countries along the Lund Principles of the European Union. It will contribute to gathering and spreading specific and interdisciplinary knowledge from various institutions from the region and the European Union where leading experts in the field work.

History 
The SEEDI arose from the cooperation between researchers from Belgrade (Serbia) and Sofia (Bulgaria) which was formally expressed in the Borovets declaration (2003) where it was argued that:

Goals 
Cultural and scientific heritage collections in the South-Eastern Europe still cannot be widely accessed in electronic form. The idea of the SEEDI is to overcome that by bringing together researches from regional and European centers having similar scientific and practical interest in digitization and to support cooperation between them. The aim is to create core groups of specialists, which would be able to consult, assist, monitor and develop innovative technologies and digitization projects collaborating with the local cultural and scientific heritage institutions.

The SEEDI would be implemented through several measures: 
 Conferences and workshops,
 The journal Review of the National Center for Digitization,
 The mailing list
 
To facilitate communication, dissemination and sharing each other's ideas, concerns, views and experiences in the field of digitization of cultural and scientific heritage.

The SEEDI is an open forum. The owners of ideas are invited to propose them through the SEEDI-communication tools and to find potential collaborators.

Notes

Citations

Bibliography 

Zoran Ognjanovic, Milena Dobreva, Nikola Ikonomov, Tamara Butigan-Vucaj, South-Eastern European Digitization Initiative, in: Heritage and beyond, Council of Europe (2009), 179-182. 
South-Eastern European Network for Digitisation of Scientific and Cultural Heritage, Borovets declaration <http://elib.mi.sanu.ac.rs/files/journals/ncd/4/d015download.pdf> (05.05.2011)
SEEDI <http://seedi.ncd.org.rs/> (05.05.2011)

External links 
 SEEDI
 Lund Principles of the European Union
 National Center for Digitization

International organizations based in Europe